"Smoke Rings in the Dark" is a song written by Rivers Rutherford and Houston Robert and recorded by American country music artist Gary Allan. It was released in August 1999 as the first single and title track from Allan's 1999 album of the same name. The song peaked at number 12 on the U.S. Billboard Hot Country Songs chart in February 2000. It also reached 76 on the Billboard Hot 100 and became his highest-charting single in Canada at number 5.

Content
The song deals with the pain of unrequited love. The narrator states that all he will leave his significant other like "smoke rings in the dark."

Critical reception
Chuck Taylor of Billboard magazine reviewed the song favorably, saying that "the production, songwriting, and performance combine to create a record that leaves a stunning impression." Taylor calls Allan's performance "wonderfully nuanced" and saying that the production has a "decidedly retro feel."

Music video
The music video was directed by Chris Rogers.

Chart positions
"Smoke Rings in the Dark" debuted at number 71 on the U.S. Billboard Hot Country Singles & Tracks chart for the week of August 14, 1999.

Year-end charts

References

1999 singles
1999 songs
Gary Allan songs
Songs written by Rivers Rutherford
Song recordings produced by Tony Brown (record producer)
Song recordings produced by Byron Hill
Song recordings produced by Mark Wright (record producer)
MCA Nashville Records singles
MCA Records singles